The Rev. Albert Watson (21 April 1828 – 21 November 1904) was an Oxford college head in the 19th century.

Watson was born in Astley, Worcestershire and educated at Brasenose College, Oxford. A classicist, he was Fellow of Brasenose from 1852 to 1886. He was a Tutor from 1854 to 1867; a Lecturer from 1867 to 1870; and Bursar
from 1871 until his election as Principal of Brasenose in 1886. He resigned in 1889; and died in 1904.

Notes

 

19th-century English Anglican priests
Classical scholars of the University of Oxford
Alumni of Brasenose College, Oxford
Principals of Brasenose College, Oxford
People from Worcester, England
1828 births
1904 deaths